Decision Earth, also referred to as Decision: Earth, was an environmental education teachers resource for junior high school students issued by Procter & Gamble in 1997.  It has been controversial.

Release of "Decision Earth"
Its asserted aim was assisting students to make informed consumer product choices, and to educate then in the environmental impact of their choices:
The unit focuses on the concept of consumer product life cycle analysis, an approach to assessing the environmental impacts of a product at each stage in its life from raw materials extraction through disposal. Using this approach, a product is evaluated in terms of energy consumed, atmospheric and waterborne emissions generated and solid waste created for disposal.

Procter & Gamble have claimed the package builds critical thinking skills

Criticism of "Decision Earth"
It has been asserted that "Decision Earth" included a series of controversial claims about waste disposal, mining and forestry issues which was distributed by the Procter & Gamble corporation to roughly 75,000 schools in the United States.
Procter & Gamble argued in its package that disposable diapers are no worse for the environment than cloth diapers, a claim based on scientific studies funded by the company, which is the world's largest manufacturer of disposable diapers. The package described garbage-fueled incineration processes where energy is recovered as "thermal recycling" without mentioning the toxic ash or emissions that result.

Decision Earth package
The materials given to teachers and studends include overhead transparency masters, student worksheets, and a teacher's guide.

References

External links
 Procter & Gamble long-term environmental sustainability vision

Procter & Gamble
Environmental education in the United States